Melocosa is a genus of spiders in the family Lycosidae. It was first described in 1937 by Gertsch. , it contains 2 species.

References

Lycosidae
Araneomorphae genera
Spiders of North America
Spiders of Brazil